Pekka Niemelä (born 1974 in Helsinki) is a Finnish ski jumping coach and a former ski jumper. He is the current head coach of the Turkish ski jumping national team.

In 1991 Niemelä was a part of Finnish silver medal team in 1991 junior World Championships in Reit im Winkl. He was irregularly part of the Finnish team in Ski Jumping World Cup from 1991 to 1996 but did not gain much success.

Niemelä started his coaching career in Puijon Hiihtoseura in 1997. From 2001 to 2002 he was the coach of Finland B national team, and between 2002 and 2006 he was the head coach of Japanese team Team Tsuchiya. In 2006 Niemelä took over as the head coach of French national team. In March 2010 he was appointed as the new head coach of the Finnish national team.

Sources

Skimuseum.fr profile

1974 births
Living people
Sportspeople from Helsinki
Finnish male ski jumpers
Finnish ski jumping coaches
20th-century Finnish people